Xi ( or ) was the world's first console-based and virtual world-based alternate reality game. It was a one-time-only play, unfolding in real time, and only available on the PlayStation 3 through the social gaming network, PlayStation Home. The game was an adventure to help find "Jess" and the meaning of Xi by collecting fragments and butterflies found in a series of secret areas in Home that changed frequently. The game also challenged the users to search for clues in the real world. The game was created by nDreams who released several spaces for Xi.  The game was promoted through a teaser campaign of clues and hints during the month prior to its release on March 23, 2009. The clues were hidden in the Menu Pad and videos in the central meeting point.

The game lasted a total of 12 weeks from its release. Xi and all of the corresponding spaces were exclusive to the European and North American versions of PlayStation Home, though there were also websites, videos, printed media and live events which were accessible to anyone. In September 2009, it was reported that the number of visits to the Xi spaces, including the ones after Xi's completion, had exceeded 5 million visits. A sequel, Xi: Continuum, was released in December 2012.

History

Early history
"Xi started at the Edinburgh Interactive Festival a couple of years ago," (from 2009) says Patrick O'Luanaigh, the founder of nDreams. "I saw a talk from Pete Edwards, who runs Home for Sony. Home seemed really exciting, and I thought it would be really cool to have an ARG – something in there to grab people’s attention and to make them want to come in. I came in and did a pitch to Phil Harrison and the Home team. They said: ‘Wow, we really like it’."

One of the game's developers revealed that it took 18 months for nDreams to develop Xi. The developer also revealed that a challenge of Xi was that it was live and they had to change things in the game because of the players taking part in the game in real time.

The launch of Xi
A month before the game's official release on March 23, 2009, clues and hints were seen in the users Menu Pad and in videos in the central meeting point of Home. The Menu Pad is where users access different things such as personal settings; the clues and hints were found in the "News" and "Latest Update" sections of the Menu Pad.

The first clue to appear in the News section was "jess are you there?----------Xi is almost ready". This clue first appeared on February 6, 2009, in Europe and on February 11, 2009, in North America.

The first video appeared on February 12, 2009, in Home's Bowling Alley (North America) and Home Square (Europe) and featured a big black monolith bearing the Greek capital letter 'Xi' and the graffiti version of the 'Xi' logo (more specifically, the one that was located in Europe's Home Square).

The monolith was later revealed to be a big black door in The Hub of 'Xi'. The door remained locked until the final days of the game.

Between February 12 and March 23, there were many clues and videos released in Home hinting at the nature and launch date of Xi. The last clue told the users that the graffiti logo which had appeared in Europe's Home Square and North America's Central Plaza would teleport players to 'The Hub' - a new Home space that acted as the information centre for the game. Xi had begun in earnest.

When users first accessed The Hub, they experienced a fly-through tour with the voice of 'Thom' offering a guided tour of the space and a brief introduction to the game's story: he is a member of the alphaAFK alpha testers who had helped to build Home, and one of his colleagues, Jess, has gone missing. After Thom's introduction, the user was given the chance to opt in or out. If they opted in, Thom gave them their first task.

This introduction remained the same for all players, no matter what date they started the game.

Synopsis

The first task was to find scattered pieces of the AlphaAFK symbol within The Hub. Collecting these unlocked a weblink to the alphaAFK clan website, which Thom then told users to access via the Online Getaway found in The Hub. Thom guided the users through a simple “Odd One Out” puzzle. After solving the puzzle and entering the answer into the HoloPAD in The Hub, users acquired the first of 24 fragments.

Users were also invited to talk to Stapler, a robot who explained each of the 20 optional expeditions that offered 20 butterflies. The first butterfly expedition asked users to name Jess's favorite band The Automatic, which could be discovered by reading through the blog posts on CafeConMiguel.com - the blog of another alphaAFK member. The users then needed to input the answer into the HoloPAD to receive the first of 20 butterflies.

Initially, only one fragment and one butterfly were available. New fragments and butterflies were made available every few days, as the Xi spaces were updated. Fragments were won by playing mini-games, solving puzzles, and searching for clues in Home and in the associated Xi websites.  All 24 fragments were required to complete Xi; the butterfly expeditions were entirely optional (tougher) side-quests that often called for cooperation and collaboration between players in the real world.

The game's story followed Jess's struggle to protect a secret project she'd developed, codenamed 'Xi'. Its nature remained unclear throughout the game, though hints and speculation suggested it was some form of advanced technology. The main antagonist was a corporation called Veilcorp, which claimed Jess had been developing Xi for them until she absconded. This story was revealed through text-chat conversations between the alphaAFK testers; videos from Jess; blogs; puzzles; the Veilcorp website; and information discovered by players at live events.

Once the users had obtained all 24 fragments (which was first possible on 10 June 2009) they were able to pass through the monolith in The Hub and experience the game's conclusion. This restriction was lifted 24 hours later, as the alphaAFK enabled any player to pass through the monolith if they wished, regardless of how many fragments they had accumulated.

Immediately after passing through the monolith, players were prompted with a message asking the user if they wanted to complete Xi or return to The Hub. If they chose to complete Xi, they were prompted with another message warning them that if they continued Xi they will no longer be able to access the Xi spaces. After definitively choosing again to complete Xi, the users were taken to The White Hall.

[[File:PSHomeXiMysteryDoor.jpg|thumb|left|225px|The monolith, the mystery door in The Hub- the end of Xi'''s mystery.]]
At this point, the player was given a dilemma: Release Xi or Destroy Xi. The player had to choose one way or the other based only on the patchy information they had learned about Xi from the various biased sources during the game.

A video was then shown corresponding to the choice they made. In either case, the outcome was unpleasant: release Xi and it turns out to be a virus that brings down the banking system, causes global chaos, but perhaps resets the human race on a more sustainable course; destroy Xi and it turns out to have been an anti-spyware virus designed to protect the privacy of the world's citizens, and by destroying it, the player had allowed Veilcorp to take total control of business, government and all personal freedoms.

After the video, the player was taken deeper into The White Hall where they met a video-realistic version of Jess - or rather 'Jessica', who explained that this whole game was a recruitment exercise to attract and identify people with particular skills spanning the real and virtual worlds. She needed to find people who can make difficult decisions in unclear situations, particularly when it comes to guiding how the world uses technology in future. The player was then presented with a summary of their performance throughout the game before Jessica hints that she'll be in touch again when the time is right.

Depending on their performance, the player was given one or more digital rewards to keep in their Home apartment. The Xi Trophy was for simply completing the game. The Xi Fragment Master Trophy was for completing Xi with all 24 fragments; and the Xi Fragment Collector Trophy was for completing Xi with at least 12 fragments. The Xi Butterfly Master Trophy was for completing Xi with all 20 butterflies; and the Xi Butterfly Collector Trophy was for completing Xi with at least 10 butterflies.

Locations
There were a total of 12 physical spaces in Xi. The White Hall wasn't a physical space that users could walk freely in. Each space served a purpose in completing Xi. Each mini-game in each space either unlocked a Fragment or a Butterfly. Some of the weird markings on the walls in some of the spaces were used for a couple of the challenges. The only spaces that are now available in Home are the Xi Museum (formerly Xi Alumni Hub), the Alpha Zone 1 spaces, and the Alpha Zone 3 spaces.

Fragments
There were a total of twenty-four fragments that the users had to obtain through various puzzles and mini-games throughout Home and some puzzles in the real world.  The fragments are different pieces of a picture of the logo of Xi which were viewable in the HoloPAD under Display fragments. The fragments were the main objectives of Xi for the users to complete. In addition to obtaining the sixth fragment, users also received a Xi T-shirt for their avatar.

Butterflies
The butterflies were optional in completing Xi and were for the users who wanted a real challenge. There were twenty in all. Stapler was the robot that told the users what they must do or where to go in order to obtain the butterflies. The butterflies were viewable in the HoloPAD under Display butterflies.

Post-Xi
After completing Xi and being returned to the central meeting point, users were no longer able to access The Hub, but instead, were able to access the Xi Alumni Hub through the same Teleport that The Hub was accessed through. After entering the Xi Alumni Hub, users were presented with one final challenge in which completing this final challenge awarded the users a Xi Alumni T-shirt for their avatar.

On July 2, 2009, the Teleport and Manhole cover were removed from the central meeting point and the Xi Alumni Hub was added to the world map (now Navigator) under the Xi logo chip in the users Menu Pad . All of the Xi spaces were removed except the Xi Alumni Hub and Alpha Zone 1 - Game Test Area, Maximum-Tilt Lobby, & Adventure Lobby. The Alpha Zone 1 spaces were accessed through the teleport in the Xi Alumni Hub.

Patrick O’Luanaigh told Edge magazine that nDreams "ended up doing 12 spaces, 24 minigames, 108 videos and four huge websites." He also mentioned that "By and large" everything went according to plan. nDreams had a chart that was 12 weeks long and that every weekday, something new was happening. "Getting in on Sony’s project early meant nDreams found itself in a privileged position" notes Edge magazine. "We were able to really push Home," says O’Luanaigh. "We were given carte blanche to mess around." He also notes how the company was fortunate that there was a fairly large Home community already there and were really satisfied how people of different languages were communicating with each other by posting in other forums, not of their own language, and helping each other out to solve Xi. "Normally, language players are fairly separate. It’s rare for people to interact like that, and it’s really satisfying" says O'Luanaigh.

The Xi Alumni Hub was temporarily removed from PlayStation Home on April 22, 2010. Due to changes introduced with the Home client update 1.35, these spaces needed to be rebuilt to ensure that they continued to function as designed. nDreams also took this opportunity to provide access to some content from Xi that hadn't been seen since Xi ended, along with some items from Xi that are available to own.

On September 24, 2010, Patrick O'Luanaigh, the CEO of nDreams, confirmed on his Twitter that the Xi Spaces will return by Christmas 2010 under the new name "Xi Museum". On December 23, 2010, the "Xi Museum" launched featuring an updated Xi Alumni Hub (now called the Xi Museum), the three Alpha Zone 1 spaces (Game Test Area, Maximum-Tilt Lobby, and Adventure Lobby), and the four Alpha Zone 3 mazes (Teamwork Maze, Ghost Maze, Ridde Maze, and The Expert Maze). New items can be unlocked from the Xi Museum and Alpha Zone spaces. In addition, the Xi Museum features a Xi Museum Shop, with items such as a Maximum-Tilt bike and the robot Stapler for users personal spaces. The public space "Party at Jess's Apartment" that was featured during Xi can now be purchased as a personal space for the users. In Europe, users had a chance to win a Stapler companion by following nDreams Twitter feed.

SequelXi: Continuum'' was announced on November 26, 2012, and launched the following month on December 12 in EU and US and December 19 in Asia. It took place over a period of 47 days, though users could complete it at their own pace. Over the 47 days, it featured new content each day, either in Home, on external websites, or via community tasks. The objective was to stop a character named EatFlamingDeath and prevent a bomb from destroying the Continuum, and in turn, Home.

References

Alternate reality games
Mixed reality
PlayStation 3 games
PlayStation 3-only games
2009 video games
Video games developed in the United Kingdom